Waleed Bahar Mousa (born 27 April 1991) is an Iraqi defender. Bahar currently plays with Jordanian club Al-Jazeera and has played for the Iraq national football team.

Honours

Country
Iraq
 2012 Arab Nations Cup: Bronze medallist
Iraq Military
 2013 World Men's Military Cup: Champions

External links
 
 Waleed Bahar at Goalzz.com

1991 births
Living people
Iraqi footballers
Iraq international footballers
Al-Shorta SC players
Association football defenders